Aradanga is a village in Kamrup district.

Transport
The village is connected to Guwahati with regular buses and other modes of transportation.

See also
 Amatala

References

Villages in Kamrup district